Leucaena retusa is a species of flowering plant in the legume family known by the common names littleleaf leadtree, goldenball leadtree, wahoo tree, and lemonball. It is native to Chihuahua and Coahuila in Mexico and Texas in the United States. It also occurs in New Mexico.

This plant is a small tree that can reach  in height. The leaves are bright green to blue-green in color and each is divided into several leaflets. The spherical flowers are yellow to white in color. The trees flower in April through October and they tend to flower profusely after rain. The wood is weak and breaks easily.

This tree grows in dry habitat and it is drought-tolerant. It is adapted to alkaline soils and full sunlight. It is often cultivated as an ornamental plant for its attractive appearance. It is easily grown from seed and it will reseed itself. It can even become weedy. It is not considered useful as a honey plant or for its wood.

Animals such as livestock and white-tailed deer find the herbage palatable. The seeds are also high in protein.

References

External links
USDA Plants Profile

retusa
Flora of Chihuahua (state)
Flora of Coahuila
Flora of Texas